Łagisza Power Station is a coal-fired thermal power station at Łagisza in Będzin, Poland. The power plant has a total installed power capacity of 1,060 MW and installed cogeneration thermal capacity of 335 MW.  It is operated by Południowy Koncern Energetyczny, a subsidiary of the Tauron Group.

Construction of the power station started in 1960, after it was decided in 1958 to build it. In 1963–1967, seven units with 120 MW generation capacity each were built.

On 12 May  2006, construction of a new unit with 460 MW unit started. It was the world's first supercritical circulating fluidized bed project with the world's largest circulating fluidized bed boiler. The boiler was supplied by Foster Wheeler, while automation was supplied by Metso Automation. The generator was supplied by Alstom. The power station went in service on 30 June 2009, being built adjacent to the two old boilers it replaced.

See also

 List of power stations in Poland
Będzin Power Station

References

Energy infrastructure completed in 1963
Energy infrastructure completed in 1967
Energy infrastructure completed in 2009
Coal-fired power stations in Poland
Cogeneration power stations in Poland
Będzin
Buildings and structures in Silesian Voivodeship